Cheat Satrey (A Woman's Life)  is the 1st ever Khmer TV opera directed by Fai Som Ang starring Pich Saparn, Keo Koliyan, Pich Vong Reksmey, Pong Rottanak, Chea Somnang and many others.

History
Pich Saparn was shot killed by her husband while filming the TV opera, she was 17 at the time. Thus, aside from being the very 1st Khmer TV opera, the film was also her last film 2 other actresses disappeared after the making of this TV series, one of them being the rising actress Pich Vong Reksmey. After years of being in the film industry, pioneering actresses Keo Koliyana and Pan Sopanny were also cast in this same film for the 1st time.

Cambodian television soap operas
1990s Cambodian television series
Cambodian Television Network original programming